The Lewis Walpole Library in Farmington, Connecticut, possesses important collections of 18th-century British literary remains, including an unrivalled quantity of Horace Walpole's papers and effects from his estate at Strawberry Hill.

The collections include 18th-century British books, manuscripts, prints, drawings, and paintings, as well as important examples of the decorative arts. They were gathered by Wilmarth Sheldon Lewis (1895–1979, a graduate of Yale in 1918) and his wife Annie Burr Lewis (1902–1959) in a group of 18th-century buildings at Farmington. The Lewis Walpole Library was presented to Yale University, of whose Library it forms a department. Wilmarth Sheldon Lewis also left two volumes of memoirs, much of them relevant to the library: Collectors Progress (1946) and One Man's Education (1967).

The Library offers residential fellowships and travel grants, along with exhibitions, lectures, seminars, and colloquia.<ref>Yale University advertisement: London Review of Books, 8 March 2018, p. 45.</ref>

PublicationsThe Age of Horace Walpole and Wilmarth Sheldon Lewis: an exhibit marking the fortieth jubilee of the Yale Edition of Horace Walpole's Correspondence and the fiftieth of the Lewis Walpole Library at Farmington [at] the College Library and the Watkinson Library, Trinity College, Hartford, Connecticut, October 29 through November 19, 1973.The Yale Edition of Horace Walpole’s Correspondence'' (48 volumes)

References

 

Yale University Library
Farmington, Connecticut
Art museums and galleries in Connecticut
Walpole, Horace
Libraries in Hartford County, Connecticut
Special collections libraries in the United States